Post Office Limited is a retail post office company in the United Kingdom that provides a wide range of products including postage stamps and banking to the public through its nationwide network of post office branches. It directly manages almost 200 of the more than 10,000 post office branches.

History

Post Office branches, along with the Royal Mail delivery service, were formerly part of the General Post Office and after 1969, the Post Office corporation. Post Office Counters Limited was created as a wholly owned subsidiary of the Post Office in 1987. After the Post Office statutory corporation was changed to a public company, Royal Mail Group, in 2001, Post Office Counters Limited became Post Office Limited.

With declining mail usage, Post Office Limited has had chronic losses, with a reported £102 million lost in 2006.  This raised concerns in the media regarding its ability as a company to operate efficiently. Plans to cut the £150m-a-year subsidy for rural post offices led to the announcement that 2,500 local post offices were to be closed. This announcement resulted in a backlash from local communities that relied on the service.

In 2007, the government gave a £1.7 billion subsidy to Royal Mail Group so that it could turn a profit by 2011. This was to be used to invest across the whole network of Royal Mail, Post Office Limited, and Parcelforce. Eighty-five Crown post offices were closed, 70 of which were sold to WHSmith. This followed a trial of six Post Office outlets in WHSmith stores. WHSmith was expected to make up to £2.5 million extra in annual profit. 2,500 sub-post offices closed between 2008 and 2009. Redundancy packages were provided from public funding (subpostmasters were paid over 20 months salary, roughly £65,000 each).

In November 2010, the government committed £1.34 billion of funding up to 2015 to Post Office Limited to enable it to modernise the Post Office network.

As part of the Postal Services Act 2011, Post Office Limited became independent of Royal Mail Group on 1 April 2012. A ten-year inter-business agreement was signed between the two companies to allow post offices to continue issuing stamps and handling letters and parcels for Royal Mail. The Act also contained the option for Post Office Limited to become a mutual organisation in the future.

On 8 February 2013, Post Office Limited announced it was planning to move around seventy of its Crown post offices into shops. This would reduce the Crown network, which it stated was losing £40 million a year, to around 300.

On 27 November 2013, the government committed an additional £640 million of funding for 2015 to 2018 to allow Post Office Limited to complete its network modernisation.

In April 2016, the Post Office agreed to hand over up to 61 more branches to WHSmith in a 10-year deal. The deal was condemned as "blatant back-door privatisation" by the Communications Workers Union.

Corporate affairs

Chief executives 
 David Mills (2002-2005)
 Alan Cook (2006-2010)
 Paula Vennells (2012-2019)
 Nick Read (2019-)

Chair 
 Alice Perkins (2011-2015)
 Tim Parker (2015-2022)

Services

As of early 2020 there are around 11,500 post office branches across the UK, of which 191 are directly managed by Post Office Limited (known as Crown offices). The majority of other branches are either run by various franchise partners or local subpostmaster or operators (who may be members of the National Federation of SubPostmasters or the CWU Postmasters Branch), as "sub-postoffices".

The Post Office has a wide variety of services throughout the network of branches. Products and services available vary throughout the network; main post offices generally provide the full range of services.

The Post Office rolled out the 'ParcelShop' scheme in Summer 2019, allowing retail stores to accept Royal Mail Internet returns, in order to expand Post Office facilities.

In towns, post offices are usually open from around 09:00 to 17:30 from Monday to Friday and from 09:00 to 12:30 on Saturday. In some country areas, opening hours are much shorter—perhaps only four hours per week. In some villages an outreach service is provided in village halls or shops. There are also "mobile post offices" using converted vans which travel between rural areas.

Many post offices are shut on Sundays and Bank Holidays. Some in smaller towns or villages are shut at lunchtime.

Postal services

The Post Office provides information on services and accepts postal items and payment on behalf of the two collection and delivery divisions of Royal Mail Group, Royal Mail and Parcelforce. These include a variety of ordinary and guaranteed services both for delivery within the United Kingdom and to international destinations. Postage stamps (including commemorative stamps and other philatelic items) are sold, while applications for redirection of mail are accepted on behalf of Royal Mail.

Post Office Local Collect is a scheme whereby undelivered mail can be redirected at customer request to a post office for convenient collection. Poste restante mail can also be held for collection by people travelling.

Financial services

The Post Office provides credit cards, insurance products, mortgages, access to high street banking services and savings through the Post Office Money umbrella brand which was launched in 2015. Most Post Office Money branded products are provided by Bank of Ireland (UK) plc with Post Office Limited acting as an appointed representative and credit broker. However, with the sale of the Bank of Ireland's UK assets to Jaja Finance in 2019, Post Office branded Credit Cards are now issued by Capital One UK. Life insurance is provided in partnership with Neilson Financial Services

Branch banking

Personal banking services are offered on behalf of a number of "partner banks" that the Post Office has agreements with. Although different services are available on behalf of different institutions, these may include cash withdrawals, paying in cash and cheques, and balance enquiries. Some post offices also have cash machines, mainly provided by Bank of Ireland.

Business banking services are also offered for customers of twenty different UK banks. Services include balance enquiries, cash withdrawals, depositing cash and cheques, and giving change.

Bill payments

A number of bill payments can be accepted on behalf of a variety of organisations including utilities, local authorities and others. These are in the form of automated payments (barcoded bills, swipe cards, key charging). The Santander Transcash system, which had been a Girobank service, enabled manual bill payment transactions, but this service was discontinued by Santander in December 2017.

Broadband and phone
The Post Office also operates as an Internet service provider; providing consumer broadband and phone services and is part of the wider Post Office Limited group. By February 2019, it had just over half a million customers across the UK. Post Office provides asymmetric digital subscriber line broadband and fibre broadband Internet products (FTTC) to residential customers.

Post Office offers two variants of router: A standard Wi-Fi router (Zyxel AMG1302-T11C) router with its ADSL broadband packages and the Zyxel VMG3925-B10B with its Fibre broadband packages.
Post Office broadband and phone services are currently supplied using the TalkTalk network and it operates UK-based call centres, with teams based in Preston, Selkirk and Chiswick.

In June 2015, the Post Office launched its own mobile virtual network operator service, Post Office Mobile. However, in August 2016 it decided "to conclude the trial as the results did not give us sufficient confidence that mobile will contribute to our goal of commercial sustainability".

In February 2021, the Post Office agreed to sell its broadband and phone services to Shell Energy and exit the telecoms market. The deal was believed to have cost Shell around £80million, with around 500,000 customers transferring to the new provider.

Post Office also runs its own flat-rate 118 Directory Enquiries service (118 855). Mobile phone top-ups are also available in Post Office branches on behalf of all the major UK mobile networks.

ID services
A passport check-and-send service is available for passport applications, where the post office staff check that a passport application is filled in correctly and has an acceptable photograph accompanying it. The service is not affiliated with HM Passport Office. Check-and-send service is not guaranteed service.

The Post Office used to offer a check-and-send service with DVLA for the photocard driving licence. Some branches now offer a photocard driving licence renewal service.

Fishing licences are issued on behalf of the Environment Agency and Natural Resources Wales from branches in England and Wales.

Selected branches issue International Driving Permits. In 2019, availability of this service was expanded from 89 to approximately 2,500 branches due to increased demand associated with the possibility of a "no deal" Brexit.

Post Office saving stamps
Post Office savings stamps were first introduced by Henry Fawcett in the 1880s but were phased out in the 1960s. These were re-introduced in August 2004 because of consumer demand. In 2010 saving stamps were withdrawn and replaced by the Budget Card.

Other services
 National Lottery games and scratchcards
 Sale and encashment of postal orders
 Foreign currency exchange and Travel Money Card
 Sales of gift vouchers redeemable at certain high street merchants
 PostPak
 Fast drop
 Drop and Go
 National Express coach tickets

Post offices not open to the public
Seven post office branches are not open to the public:

Court (Buckingham Palace) – however, this is managed by Royal Mail as of 2014
House of Commons
Portcullis House
Royal Automobile Club, 89 Pall Mall, London
Scottish Parliament
Windsor Castle
20 Finsbury Street, London, EC2Y 9AQ. Post Office HQ

Controversies

Horizon payment system errors

In April 2015, the BBC described a confidential report that alleged that the Post Office had made 'failings' with regard to accounting issues with its Horizon IT system that were identified by sub-postmasters as early as 2000. The article claimed that an independent investigation by forensic accountants Second Sight had found that the Post Office had failed to identify the root cause of accounting shortfalls in many cases before launching court proceedings against sub-postmasters. The shortfalls could have been caused by criminals using malicious software, by IT systems or by human error, the report said. An earlier article by the BBC had claimed that a confidential report contained allegations that the Post Office had refused to hand over documents that the accountants felt they needed to investigate properly, that training was not good enough, that equipment was outdated, and that power cuts and communication problems had made things worse. The Post Office has claimed that their system was not at fault.

In 2019, the Post Office was lambasted by the High Court for its 'institutional obstinacy or refusal to consider' that its Horizon computer system might be flawed. The judge, Mr Justice Fraser, characterised this stance as "the 21st-century equivalent of maintaining that the earth is flat." In spite of the court action against its sub-postmasters, which was described by a judge as "aggressive and, literally, dismissive", the Post Office's chief executive Paula Vennells, who had in the meantime left the Post Office and taken up posts in the NHS and the Cabinet Office, was controversially awarded a CBE in the 2019 New Year Honours for "services to the Post Office and to charity". On 19 March 2020 she was harshly criticised in the House of Commons, particularly by Kevan Jones, MP for North Durham, who said:

Arms

See also
Penny Post Credit Union
1st Class Credit Union

References

External links

Postwatch – the watchdog for postal services joined Consumer Focus in October 2008

Financial services companies established in 1987
Government-owned companies of the United Kingdom
Postal system of the United Kingdom
Retail companies established in 1987
Retail companies of the United Kingdom
Royal Mail
1987 establishments in the United Kingdom